The men's 3000 metres steeplechase event at the 2005 Asian Athletics Championships was held in Incheon, South Korea on September 2.

Results

References
Results

2005 Asian Athletics Championships
Steeplechase at the Asian Athletics Championships